4FRNT Skis is an independent brand of alpine ski equipment that helped to pioneer the development of the freeskiing movement. 4FRNT introduced the model of a rider-owned and operated ski company to the sport.

Products manufactured by 4FRNT include skis, poles, bindings, and accessories.

History
4FRNT Skis was founded by professional skier Matt Sterbenz in 2002 in a garage in Truckee, CA and moved to a factory in 2003.
In 2004  4FRNT products were unveiled at the Las Vegas SIA show, the company's first park ski went into production.
4FRNT moved to a new headquarters in Salt Lake City in 2005. In 2017 Jason Levinthal acquired the company and moved home base to Burlington, VT. In 2020 Jason Levinthal sold the company to Charlie Johnson, Ebi Lange, & Will Armenta.
In 2006 production was outsourced to Europe.
4FRNT changed its logo in 2007.
CR Johnson joined the 4FRNT team in 2009, delivering new concepts to ski design, as a new owner is brought in.
While they are American owned, the majority of products are produced in Canada and Europe.

The White Room
The white room was first introduced in 2010. The White Room served as a production and prototype facility, a number of different models were produced in house in Salt Lake City, Utah. The design and manufacture of such skis, (for example the Renegade) were done in the White Room until 2017. Although the ski press has since been relocated to Washington, the idea of the White Room lives on. Athletes, designers, engineers, and testers are in constant collaboration to keep designs fresh and innovative. They now work with their factories to produce prototypes that can be shipped to riders worldwide to test and give feedback on.

Team
Team consists of Eric Hjorleifson and Thayne Rich. With other core freeride skiers from across the world.

Products
4FRNT manufactures skis, poles, gear and apparel. Skis are produced at Utopie MFG in Canada and Elan in Slovenia.

Notable skis, past and present
 RENEGADE - White Room Signature Series -  The brainchild of Eric Hjorleifson prototyped and produced in 4FRNT's SLC White Room. A reverse camber, matching sidecut powder ski.
 Raven - White Room Signature Series - The final chapter in the trilogy of Eric Hjorleifson's full reverse camber quiver. Ideal for backcountry use and ski mountaineering.
 HOJI - New Eric Hjorliefson pro model ski, which replaced the EHP for the 2012/2013 season.
 MSP99 - Matt Sterbenz Signature Model - Traditional camber dual radius sidecut all mountain ski
 MSP107 - Matt Sterbenz Signature Model - Tradition camber dual radius sidecut powder focused all mountain ski.
 Devastator - A 4FRNT staple. Fully redesigned in 2020, debuting 4FRNT's new multi radius rocker profile, increasing all mountain and powder performance. Replaced the Turbo - all mountain
 InThayne- Thayne Rich Promodel- Full rockered Freestyle Backcountry ski
 Switch - Traditional camber all mountain freestyle ski

References

External links
 

Ski equipment manufacturers
American brands